Botswana competed at the 2019 World Athletics Championships in Doha, Qatar, from 27 September - 6 October 2019. The country sent 6 athletes to compete in 3 events. Leungo Scotch had the best performance for Botswana, as he broke a personal best in the Men's 400 meters semifinal.

Results 
(Q/q - qualified, DNS - did not start, DNF - did not finish, DQ - disqualified, PB - personal best)

Men

Track and Road events

Women

Track and Road events

References

Nations at the 2019 World Athletics Championships
World Championships in Athletics
Botswana at the World Championships in Athletics